Chah Mazar may refer to:
 Chah Mazar-e Olya
 Chah Mazar-e Sofla
 Chah-e Mazar